This list of PHQ cards are the postcards issued by the British Post Office illustration the designs of their commemorative stamps started in 1973.

PHQ issues 

Philately of the United Kingdom